Wysokie Mazowieckie  is a town in north-eastern Poland, in Podlaskie Voivodeship.  It is the capital of Wysokie Mazowieckie County.  Population is 10,034 .

In town there is one of the biggest dairy companies in this part of Europe - "Mlekovita".
in 2018, the city was among the richest municipalities in Poland, has ranked 11th in the country

Jewish cemetery
The Jewish cemetery in Wysokie Mazowieckie had been devastated in World War II. It was restored in 2006 and, protected by a fence, is maintained regularly by the Foundation for the Preservation of Jewish Heritage in Poland. The Jewish cemetery contains a memorial to local Jews who were murdered in the Holocaust. The memorial monument was vandalized in August 2012.

Sport 
 Ruch Wysokie Mazowieckie - Polish football club

International relations

Twin towns – Sister cities 
Wysokie Mazowieckie is twinned with:
  Alpiarça, Portugal
Mejshagola - Lithuania
Wysokie - Belarus

Notable persons from Wysokie Mazowieckie 
 Jerzy Barycki (born March 15, 1949 in Wysokie Mazowieckie, Poland), Polish-Canadian water resources engineer and civic activist
 Jacek Bogucki (born 13 February 1959 in Wysokie Mazowieckie), Polish politician. He was elected to the Sejm on 25 September 2005 with 7,189 votes in 24 Białystok district as a candidate from the Law and Justice list.
 Wojciech Borzuchowski (born 10 November 1961 in Wysokie Mazowieckie), Polish politician, a member of Law and Justice party until 2007, when he joined the Polish People's Party. He was elected to Sejm on 25 September 2001 and served until 2005.
 Jacob Burck (January 7, 1907 – May 11, 1982), Polish-born Jewish-American painter, sculptor, and award-winning editorial cartoonist. Active in the Communist movement from 1926 as a political cartoonist and muralist, Burck quit the Communist Party after a visit to the Soviet Union in 1936, deeply offended by political demands there to manipulate his work.
 Przemysław Czajkowski (born 26 October 1988 in Wysokie Mazowieckie), Polish athlete specializing in the discus throw. His personal best in the event is 65.61 meters, achieved in 2012 in Łódź.
 Jan Stanisław Jankowski (6 May 1882 – 13 March 1953; noms de guerre Doktor, Jan, Klonowski, Sobolewski, Soból), Polish politician, an important figure in the Polish civil resistance during World War II and a Government Delegate at Home. Arrested by the NKVD, he was sentenced in the Trial of the Sixteen and murdered in a Soviet prison.
 Kazimierz Kamieński (nom de guerre "Gryf" and "Huzar"; born 8 January 1919 in Markowo-Wólka, died 11 October 1953 in a communist prison in Białystok), Polish Army officer, commander in the underground Polish Home Army (AK), ROAK and the anti-communist organization Freedom and Independence (WiN). He was one of the longest fighting soldiers of the Polish anti-Communist resistance after World War II.
 Jan Kucharzewski (27 May 1876 in Wysokie Mazowieckie – 4 July 1952), Polish historian, lawyer, and politician. He was the prime minister of Poland from 1917 to 1918.
 Łukasz Załuska (born 16 June 1982), Polish professional football goalkeeper.

References

External links 
 Official town webpage (Polish)
 Wysokie Mazowieckie Yizkor (Holocaust Memorial) Book (Yiddish, Hebrew & English)
 Wysokie-Mazowieckie Memorial Book
 We Remember Jewish Wysokie Mazowieckie

 
Podlachian Voivodeship
Łomża Governorate
Białystok Voivodeship (1919–1939)
Belastok Region
Holocaust locations in Poland